Ann Mortifee,  (born 30 November 1947) is a Canadian singer, composer and librettist, author, storyteller, and keynote speaker. Her music blends folk, musical theatre, pop, sacred and world music. She is a member of the Order of Canada, the highest honour bestowed on civilians by the Government of Canada.

Early years

Born in Durban, South Africa, Mortifee lived in the province of Natal until the age of 10. Her father, who was deeply opposed to the country's racist apartheid regime, immigrated to Canada with his wife and children and settled in Vancouver, British Columbia.

Family 
She was married to the late Paul Horn, a jazz flutist and one of the early new age musicians. Her younger sister, Jane Mortifee, also an artist, has on occasion performed onstage with Mortifee and on her albums.

Awards 
Mortifee has received national and international distinctions and awards for her albums, concerts, musicals, scores for ballet, film, opera and TV as well as her book, In Love with the Mystery. She also facilitates arts and consciousness workshops, and has co-founded two foundations - one for social innovation and one for forestry conservation.

Discography
 1973: The Ecstasy of Rita Joe (cast recording from the Royal Winnipeg Ballet's contemporary dance production of The Ecstasy of Rita Joe)
 1975: Baptism - first solo album
 1980: Journey to Kairos - based on Mortifee's Journey to Kairos one-woman show and award-winning TV special
 1982: Reflections on Crooked Walking - the first full-length musical created and written by Mortifee 
 1983: Born to Live - written with Michel Legrand
 1984: Bright Encounter
 1985: Jacques Brel Lives (from the cast reunion of the original Arts Club Vancouver production of Jacques Brel is Alive and Well and Living in Paris)
 1985: Christmas Connection, with the Royal Philharmonic Orchestra and the Chicago Synthesizer-Rhythm Ensemble
 1991: Serenade at the Doorway
 1994: Healing Journey
 2005: Into the Heart of the Sangoma
 2010: In Love With the Mystery - musical accompaniment (with Paul Horn) to Mortifee's book In Love With the Mystery

Selected awards and recognition
  1967: Appeared as The Singer, and composed the musical score (with Willie Dunn) for the world premiere of George Ryga's  play The Ecstasy of Rita Joe - Vancouver Playhouse Theatre 
  1975: Honorable Mention, Best Original Music, for Great Grand Mother documentary - Alberta Film and TV Festival
 1976: Featured composer/artist on BBC TWO TV series The Camera and the Song
 1980: TV Ontario Special, Journey to Kairos, Ann's one woman show, received Worldfest-Houston International Film Festival Grand Prix Award 
 1981: West Coast Music Award - Best Female Vocalist
 1982: Genie Award nomination, Best Original Song ("Gypsy Born"), from the movie Surfacing
 1984: Juno Award nominations: Most Promising Female Vocalist of the Year, Best Children's Album ("Reflections on Crooked Walking")
 1986: Bach's Magnificat CTV special (with Moe Koffman and Bobby McFerrin): Golden Sheaf Award
 1991: Juno Award nomination, Most Promising Female Vocalist of the Year
 1991: Appointed a Member of the Order of Canada
 1992: Inducted into BC Entertainment Hall of Fame
 1992: YWCA Woman of Distinction Award, Arts and Culture
 1994: Featured soloist, 1994 Commonwealth Games Closing Ceremony
 2000: Healing Journey project featured on the CBC Man Alive series
 2002: Queen Elizabeth II Golden Jubilee Medal for outstanding and exemplary contributions to the community and Canada
 2007: Narrator, Emmy Award-winning documentary Bhutan: Taking the Middle Road to Happiness
 2011: Narrator, Emmy Award nominee documentary When the Mountain Calls
 2012: Queen Elizabeth II Diamond Jubilee Medal for service to Canada

References

External links
 Official website
 Canadian Encyclopedia profile

1947 births
Living people
People from Durban
South African emigrants to Canada
Canadian singer-songwriters
Musicians from Vancouver
Members of the Order of Canada
20th-century Canadian women singers
21st-century Canadian women singers